The Rarest Kind is the pseudonym for the new pop rock project formed in late-2017 by Chicago-based Songwriter/Producer Tony Martino.  Martino's songs have previously been featured in television shows such as the "Ghost Whisperer" on CBS, MTV's "The Real World" and "Road Rules", Discovery Channel's "Dr. G: Medical Examiner" and many others.  He has also received critical acclaim and other mentions in major media publications and music magazines such as the New York Times, Wall Street Journal, Daily Herald, Amplifier Magazine, and Performing Songwriter Magazine.

Biography 
Tony Martino created "The Rarest Kind" as a medium to showcase a musical style that differs from his previous projects.  As the primary songwriter and producer, Martino plays the majority of the instruments on all of his recordings, but it is unclear as to whether or not that will change with "The Rarest Kind". As of August 2017, Martino has announced an album titled "Almost Totally Serious" for a new solo-project called "The Rarest Kind, " with the songs having already been mixed by renowned engineers Mark Needham (Imagine Dragons, The Killers, Fleetwood Mac, etc.) and Brian Malouf (Michael Jackson, Pearl Jam, Madonna, etc.), and with Brad Pemberton, formerly of Ryan Adams & The Cardinals, guesting on drums.  Martino is also writing songs for other artists.

References 

Alternative rock groups from Illinois
Alternative rock groups from Chicago
Musical groups established in 2017
Musical groups from Chicago
2017 establishments in Illinois